WYQS (90.5 FM) is a radio station licensed to Mars Hill, North Carolina, United States. The station is owned by Western North Carolina Public Radio, Inc. (styled as "Blue Ridge Public Radio"), owner of the area's flagship public radio station, WCQS. The format is a mixture of NPR and BBC World Service programs, plus some locally sourced programming.

As well as being available via a number of low-power translators as far apart as Brevard, Bryson City, Hendersonville, and Waynesville, BPR News is carried on the second HD Radio channel for WCQS Asheville (WCQS HD2). It is also streamed live via the Blue Ridge Public Radio mobile app and on the station's website, making it available over a much wider area than its FM reach alone would allow.

History
The station went on the air as WVMH-FM in 1975; it was originally owned by Mars Hill College.

On April 12, 2005, after being purchased by Blue Ridge Public Radio, the station changed its call sign to the current WYQS and became a full repeater of WCQS. In 2008, the station broke off and began airing programming from the BBC World Service 24 hours a day. This 24-hour relay of BBC programming continued, uninterrupted, for almost a decade.

This station's transmitter was relocated to Big Knob after the Madison County, North Carolina Board of Commissioners voted to allow space to be leased on the tower there.

Relaunch as BPR News 
In the spring of 2017, WCQS and its associated stations rebranded under the name "Blue Ridge Public Radio", with WCQS (and its repeaters and translators) continuing to air the established format of NPR programming and classical music. At this point WYQS became the home for a new channel, BPR News, with the aim of providing listeners with the choice of an all-speech format station in addition to the established NPR/classical format on WCQS.

The reception areas of WCQS and BPR News overlap significantly in some areas due to the topography, giving listeners a choice of FM listening from Blue Ridge Public Radio. The station also makes efforts to push uptake of its mobile app and streaming services.

On October 11, 2022, it was announced the Blue Ridge Public Radio will swap its formats for WCQS and WYQS on October 31.

Programming 
Much of BPR News is a straight simulcast of the speech-based programming on WCQS, but in time slots where WQCS airs music, BPR News carries news and talk programming, providing listeners who dislike the classical format with a choice of listening.

On weekdays, following an overnight relay of the BBC World Service, NPR's Morning Edition airs from 5 to 9am, followed by the BBC's Newshour from 9 to 10am, and 1A with Joshua Johnson from 10am until noon.

Between noon and 1pm the station carries The State of Things with Frank Stasio, a live show produced daily by North Carolina Public Radio with help from Blue Ridge Public Radio. The program concentrates on topics of interest in North Carolina and is broadcast from WUNC, with regular contributions from BPR helping to provide perspective and input from the northwest corner of the state.

In the afternoons Here and Now goes out between 1 and 3pm, before BPR News rejoins WCQS from 3 to 7pm for Fresh Air with Terri Gross, All Things Considered, and Marketplace. At 7pm the station reverts to its own schedule, with some daytime shows receiving a repeat broadcast in the evenings on BPR News before the station joins the BBC World Service at 9pm.

Weekend programs include NPR's Weekend Edition and Weekend All Things Considered, along with a selection of NPR and locally produced programs such as Wait Wait... Don't Tell Me!, Ask Me Another, A Prairie Home Companion, This American Life and The Splendid Table. Some weekend NPR programs are not simulcast, with WCQS and BPR News having individual programming at certain points across the weekend.

Translators
In addition to the main 90.5 signal and WCQS HD2, BPR News is heard over five translators in western North Carolina:

On October 31, 2022, W268CL will swap places with W213BX, which was simulcasting WCQS.

Notes:

References

External links
 

YQS
NPR member stations
1975 establishments in North Carolina
Radio stations established in 1975